Antes Fort is an unincorporated community in Lycoming County, Pennsylvania, United States. Antes Fort has a post office with ZIP code 17720.

References

Unincorporated communities in Lycoming County, Pennsylvania
Unincorporated communities in Pennsylvania